Pedro Listur (6 April 1922 – 5 September 2004) was a Uruguayan athlete. He competed in the men's high jump at the 1948 Summer Olympics.

References

1922 births
2004 deaths
Athletes (track and field) at the 1948 Summer Olympics
Uruguayan male high jumpers
Olympic athletes of Uruguay
Place of birth missing